Hashimura (written: 橋村, lit. "bridge village") is a Japanese surname. Notable people with the surname include:

, Japanese footballer
, Japanese footballer

Japanese-language surnames